In mathematics, modular arithmetic is a system of arithmetic for integers, where numbers "wrap around" when reaching a certain value, called the modulus. The modern approach to modular arithmetic was developed by Carl Friedrich Gauss in his book Disquisitiones Arithmeticae, published in 1801.

A familiar use of modular arithmetic is in the 12-hour clock, in which the day is divided into two 12-hour periods. If the time is 7:00 now, then 8 hours later it will be 3:00. Because the hour number starts over at zero when it reaches 12, this is arithmetic modulo 12. In terms of the definition below, 15 is congruent to 3 modulo 12, so "15:00" on a 24-hour clock is displayed "3:00" on a 12-hour clock.

Congruence

Congruence modulo  is a congruence relation, meaning that it is an equivalence relation that is compatible with the operations of addition, subtraction, and multiplication. Congruence modulo  is denoted:

The parentheses mean that  applies to the entire equation, not just to the right-hand side (here). This notation is not to be confused with the notation  (without parentheses), which refers to the modulo operation.

The congruence relation may be rewritten as

explicitly showing its relationship with Euclidean division. That is,

where  is the common remainder. Subtracting these two expressions, we recover the previous relation:

by setting

Examples
In modulus 12, one can assert that:

because , which is a multiple of 12. Another way to express this is to say that both 38 and 14 have the same remainder 2, when divided by 12.

The definition of congruence also applies to negative values. For example:

Basic properties 

The congruence relation satisfies all the conditions of an equivalence relation:
 Reflexivity:  
 Symmetry:  if .

  for any integer  (compatibility with translation)
  for any integer  (compatibility with scaling)
  for any integer 
  (compatibility with addition)
  (compatibility with subtraction)
  (compatibility with multiplication)
  for any non-negative integer  (compatibility with exponentiation)
 , for any polynomial  with integer coefficients (compatibility with polynomial evaluation)

If , then it is generally false that . However, the following is true:

For cancellation of common terms, we have the following rules:

 If , where  is any integer, then 

The modular multiplicative inverse is defined by the following rules:
 
This integer  is called a modular multiplicative inverse of  modulo .
 If  and  exists, then  (compatibility with multiplicative inverse, and, if , uniqueness modulo )

The multiplicative inverse   may be efficiently computed by solving Bézout's equation  for —using the Extended Euclidean algorithm.

Advanced properties
Some of the more advanced properties of congruence relations are the following:
 Fermat's little theorem: If  is prime and does not divide , then .
 Wilson's theorem:  is prime if and only if .
If a primitive root modulo  exists, then there are exactly  such primitive roots, where  is the Euler's totient function.
 Quadratic residue: An integer  is a quadratic residue modulo , if there exists an integer  such that .

Congruence classes 
The congruence relation is an equivalence relation. The equivalence class modulo  of an integer  is the set of all integers of the form  where  is any integer.

Each residue class modulo   contains exactly one integer in the range  Thus, these  integers are representatives of their respective residue classes. 

It is generally easier to work with integers than sets of integers; that is, the representatives most often considered, rather than their residue classes. 

Consequently,   denotes generally the unique integer  such that  and  it is called the residue of   modulo .

Residue systems
Each residue class modulo  may be represented by any one of its members, although we usually represent each residue class by the smallest nonnegative integer which belongs to that class (since this is the proper remainder which results from division). Any two members of different residue classes modulo  are incongruent modulo . Furthermore, every integer belongs to one and only one residue class modulo .

The set of integers } is called the least residue system modulo . Any set of  integers, no two of which are congruent modulo , is called a complete residue system modulo .

The least residue system is a complete residue system, and a complete residue system is simply a set containing precisely one representative of each residue class modulo . For example, the least residue system modulo 4 is {0, 1, 2, 3}. Some other complete residue systems modulo 4 include:

{1, 2, 3, 4}
{13, 14, 15, 16}
{−2, −1, 0, 1}
{−13, 4, 17, 18}
{−5, 0, 6, 21}
{27, 32, 37, 42}

Some sets which are not complete residue systems modulo 4 are:

{−5, 0, 6, 22}, since 6 is congruent to 22 modulo 4.
{5, 15}, since a complete residue system modulo 4 must have exactly 4 incongruent residue classes.

Reduced residue systems

The set {5,15} from above, for example, is an instance of a reduced residue system modulo 4.

Integers modulo n
The notation  is, however, not recommended because it can be confused with the set of -adic integers.

The set is defined for n > 0 as:

 
 
 

The verification that this is a proper definition uses the properties given before.

In this way,  becomes a commutative ring. For example, in the ring , we have

as in the arithmetic for the 24-hour clock.

Thus  is a field when  is a maximal ideal (i.e., when  is prime).

This can also be constructed from the group  under the addition operation alone.

Rather than excluding the special case , it is more useful to include  (which, as mentioned before, is isomorphic to the ring  of integers). In fact, this inclusion is useful when discussing the characteristic of a ring.

The ring of integers modulo  is a finite field if and only if  is prime (this ensures that every nonzero element has a multiplicative inverse). If  is a prime power with k > 1, there exists a unique (up to isomorphism) finite field  with  elements, but this is not , which fails to be a field because it has zero-divisors.

This forms a commutative group under multiplication, with order .

Extension to real numbers

Applications
In theoretical mathematics, modular arithmetic is one of the foundations of number theory, touching on almost every aspect of its study, and it is also used extensively in group theory, ring theory, knot theory, and abstract algebra. In applied mathematics, it is used in computer algebra, cryptography, computer science, chemistry and the visual and musical arts.

A very practical application is to calculate checksums within serial number identifiers. For example, International Standard Book Number (ISBN) uses modulo 11 (for 10 digit ISBN) or modulo 10 (for 13 digit ISBN) arithmetic for error detection. Likewise, International Bank Account Numbers (IBANs), for example, make use of modulo 97 arithmetic to spot user input errors in bank account numbers. In chemistry, the last digit of the CAS registry number (a unique identifying number for each chemical compound) is a check digit, which is calculated by taking the last digit of the first two parts of the CAS registry number times 1, the previous digit times 2, the previous digit times 3 etc., adding all these up and computing the sum modulo 10.

In cryptography, modular arithmetic directly underpins public key systems such as RSA and Diffie–Hellman, and provides finite fields which underlie elliptic curves, and is used in a variety of symmetric key algorithms including Advanced Encryption Standard (AES), International Data Encryption Algorithm (IDEA), and RC4. RSA and Diffie–Hellman use modular exponentiation.

In computer algebra, modular arithmetic is commonly used to limit the size of integer coefficients in intermediate calculations and data. It is used in polynomial factorization, a problem for which all known efficient algorithms use modular arithmetic. It is used by the most efficient implementations of polynomial greatest common divisor, exact linear algebra and Gröbner basis algorithms over the integers and the rational numbers. As posted on Fidonet in the 1980s and archived at Rosetta Code, modular arithmetic was used to disprove Euler's sum of powers conjecture on a Sinclair QL microcomputer using just one-fourth of the integer precision used by a CDC 6600 supercomputer to disprove it two decades earlier via a brute force search.

In computer science, modular arithmetic is often applied in bitwise operations and other operations involving fixed-width, cyclic data structures. The modulo operation, as implemented in many programming languages and calculators, is an application of modular arithmetic that is often used in this context. The logical operator XOR sums 2 bits, modulo 2.

In music, arithmetic modulo 12 is used in the consideration of the system of twelve-tone equal temperament, where octave and enharmonic equivalency occurs (that is, pitches in a 1:2 or 2:1 ratio are equivalent, and C-sharp is considered the same as D-flat).

The method of casting out nines offers a quick check of decimal arithmetic computations performed by hand. It is based on modular arithmetic modulo 9, and specifically on the crucial property that 10 ≡ 1 (mod 9).

Arithmetic modulo 7 is used in algorithms that determine the day of the week for a given date. In particular, Zeller's congruence and the Doomsday algorithm make heavy use of modulo-7 arithmetic.

More generally, modular arithmetic also has application in disciplines such as law (e.g., apportionment), economics (e.g., game theory) and other areas of the social sciences, where proportional division and allocation of resources plays a central part of the analysis.

Computational complexity
Since modular arithmetic has such a wide range of applications, it is important to know how hard it is to solve a system of congruences. A linear system of congruences can be solved in polynomial time with a form of Gaussian elimination, for details see linear congruence theorem. Algorithms, such as Montgomery reduction, also exist to allow simple arithmetic operations, such as multiplication and exponentiation modulo , to be performed efficiently on large numbers.

Some operations, like finding a discrete logarithm or a quadratic congruence appear to be as hard as integer factorization and thus are a starting point for cryptographic algorithms and encryption. These problems might be NP-intermediate.

Solving a system of non-linear modular arithmetic equations is NP-complete.

Example implementations

Below are three reasonably fast C functions, two for performing modular multiplication and one for modular exponentiation on unsigned integers not larger than 63 bits, without overflow of the transient operations.

An algorithmic way to compute :

uint64_t mul_mod(uint64_t a, uint64_t b, uint64_t m) {
    if (!((a | b) & (0xFFFFFFFFULL << 32))) return a * b % m;

    uint64_t d = 0, mp2 = m >> 1;
    int i;
    if (a >= m) a %= m;
    if (b >= m) b %= m;
    for (i = 0; i < 64; ++i) {
        d = (d > mp2) ? (d << 1) - m : d << 1;
        if (a & 0x8000000000000000ULL) d += b;
        if (d >= m) d -= m;
        a <<= 1;
    }
    return d;
}

On computer architectures where an extended precision format with at least 64 bits of mantissa is available (such as the long double type of most x86 C compilers), the following routine is faster than a solution using a loop, by employing the trick that, by hardware, floating-point multiplication results in the most significant bits of the product kept, while integer multiplication results in the least significant bits kept:

uint64_t mul_mod(uint64_t a, uint64_t b, uint64_t m) {
    long double x;
    uint64_t c;
    int64_t r;
    if (a >= m) a %= m;
    if (b >= m) b %= m;
    x = a;
    c = x * b / m;
    r = (int64_t)(a * b - c * m) % (int64_t)m;
    return r < 0 ? r + m : r;
}

Below is a C function for performing modular exponentiation, that uses the  function implemented above.

An algorithmic way to compute :

uint64_t pow_mod(uint64_t a, uint64_t b, uint64_t m) {
    uint64_t r = m == 1 ? 0 : 1;
    while (b > 0) {
        if (b & 1) r = mul_mod(r, a, m);
        b = b >> 1;
        a = mul_mod(a, a, m);
    }
    return r;
}

However, for all above routines to work,  must not exceed 63 bits.

See also

 Boolean ring
 Circular buffer
 Division (mathematics)
 Finite field
 Legendre symbol
 Modular exponentiation
 Modulo (mathematics)
 Multiplicative group of integers modulo n
 Pisano period (Fibonacci sequences modulo n)
 Primitive root modulo n
 Quadratic reciprocity
 Quadratic residue
 Rational reconstruction (mathematics)
 Reduced residue system
 Serial number arithmetic (a special case of modular arithmetic)
 Two-element Boolean algebra
 Topics relating to the group theory behind modular arithmetic:
 Cyclic group
 Multiplicative group of integers modulo n
 Other important theorems relating to modular arithmetic:
 Carmichael's theorem
 Chinese remainder theorem
 Euler's theorem
 Fermat's little theorem (a special case of Euler's theorem)
 Lagrange's theorem
 Thue's lemma

Notes

References
 John L. Berggren. "modular arithmetic". Encyclopædia Britannica.
 . See in particular chapters 5 and 6 for a review of basic modular arithmetic.
 Maarten Bullynck "Modular Arithmetic before C.F. Gauss. Systematisations and discussions on remainder problems in 18th-century Germany"
 Thomas H. Cormen, Charles E. Leiserson, Ronald L. Rivest, and Clifford Stein. Introduction to Algorithms, Second Edition. MIT Press and McGraw-Hill, 2001. . Section 31.3: Modular arithmetic, pp. 862–868.
 Anthony Gioia, Number Theory, an Introduction Reprint (2001) Dover. .

External links
 
 In this modular art article, one can learn more about applications of modular arithmetic in art.
 An article on modular arithmetic on the GIMPS wiki
 Modular Arithmetic and patterns in addition and multiplication tables

 
Finite rings
Group theory
Articles with example C code